Ronnie Thompson may refer to:

 Ronnie Thompson (American football) (born ca. 1944), American football coach
 Ronnie Thompson (politician) (1934–2020), American politician and mayor of Macon, Georgia
 Ronnie Thompson, pseudonymous author of the 2008 book Screwed: The Truth About Life as a Prison Officer
 Ronnie Thompson (director), co-director of the 2012 film Tower Block
 Ronny Thompson (born 1969), American basketball coach and sports broadcaster

See also 
 Ron Thompson (disambiguation)
 Ronald Thomson (disambiguation)